Karline is a German feminine given name that is an alternate form of Karla. Notable people known by this name include the following:

Given name
Karlīne Nīmane (born 1990) Latvian basketball player
Karlīne Štāla (born 1986) Latvian race car driver

See also

Karine
Karlene
Karlie
Karlin (surname)
Karlina
Karoline (disambiguation)
Karrine Steffans

Notes

German feminine given names